Dutch Hollow may refer to:

Dutch Hollow, a 2015 film
Dutch Hollow (Shannon County, Missouri), a valley in Missouri
Dutch Hollow Lake, a lake in Wisconsin